Kelly Phelps (born c. 1959) is a retired American football quarterback that played for the Oklahoma Sooners from 1978 to 1982. He led them to the 1983 Fiesta Bowl.

References

1950s births
Living people
American football quarterbacks
Oklahoma Sooners football players
Sportspeople from Oklahoma